The men's masters competition for bowling at the 2019 Southeast Asian Games in Philippines was held on 6 December 2019 at Coronado Lanes, Starmall EDSA-Shaw.

Schedule 
All times are Philippine Standard Time (UTC+8).

Results

Preliminary 
Detailed result as in below:

Stepladder finals

References 

Men's masters